Centemodon (meaning "point tooth") is an extinct genus of basal phytosaur from the Late Triassic Period. It lived in what is now Pennsylvania, United States. It is classified as a nomen dubium. It was found in the Red Sandstone Formation near the Schuyklill River. Centemodon may have been related to Suchoprion. It was a small phytosaur, weighing no more than  when fully grown.

Discovery and naming
Sometime before the Bone Wars, a palaeontologist known as Dr. Leo (surname unknown) discovered several fossil fragmentary teeth that later became the Centemodon holotype. When Leo described the fragments, he was unsure of what they belonged to, and Leo did not name the fragments. They were eventually named in 1856 by Isaac Lea.

References

Phytosaurs
Prehistoric reptile genera
Late Triassic reptiles of North America
Triassic geology of Pennsylvania
Paleontology in Pennsylvania
Nomina dubia
Fossil taxa described in 1856
Taxa named by Isaac Lea